Iron(III) sulfide, also known as ferric sulfide or sesquisulfide, is one of the several binary iron sulfides. It is a solid, black powder that degrades at ambient temperature.

Reactions 
() decays at a temperature over 20 °C into iron(II) sulfide (FeS) and elemental sulfur:
 Fe2S3 → 2 FeS + S
With hydrochloric acid it decays according to the following reaction equation:
 Fe2S3 + 4 HCl →  2 FeCl2 + 2 H2S + S

Greigite
Greigite, with the chemical formula , is a mixed valence compound containing both Fe(III) and Fe(II). It is the sulfur equivalent of the iron oxide magnetite (Fe3O4). As established by X-ray crystallography, the S anions form a cubic close-packed lattice, and the Fe cations occupy both tetrahedral and octahedral sites.>

References
 

Iron(III) compounds
Sulfides
Synthetic materials